Lesbian, gay, bisexual, and transgender (LGBT) persons in Libya face legal challenges not experienced by non-LGBT residents. Since the fall of the Gaddafi regime in 2011, the status regarding homosexuality in Libya remains unchanged.

Legality of same-sex sexual activity

Criminal laws

The country's criminal code prohibits all sexual activity outside of a lawful marriage. Under Article 407(4) of the Penal Code (1953), private homosexual acts between consenting adults are illegal.

In the 1990s, the General People's Congress began to approve "purification" laws designed to enforce a harsh view of Islamic law on the population. Libyan courts were given the power to use amputation, flogging and other punishments against persons found to be violating traditional Islamic morality.

In 2010, the Gay Middle East blog reported that two adult men had been charged with "indecent acts", which meant cross-dressing and homosexual conduct.

Female homosexuality would also appear to be illegal, as is making any sort of public acknowledgment that a person is gay.  In 2010 a French asylum case involved a Libyan girl who sought asylum after being jailed, raped and then returned to her family for a forced marriage after she made a public statement online that she was gay.
Vigilante executions, in lieu of the penal code, are more commonplace in ISIS-controlled territories.

The criminal code is still technically in operation, although much of Libya is run by competing militias who may choose to execute LGBT people. ISIS in Libya has publicly executed men for homosexuality.

Gaddafi Government
The Gaddafi government did not permit the public advocacy of LGBT rights.  When discussed, it was always in a negative manner, in keeping with traditional Islamic morality.

In 2003, Gaddafi stated that he believed that it was "impossible" to contract AIDS–HIV through unprotected, heterosexual vaginal sex.

Transititional Government
The Transitional post-Gaddafi government continues to oppose LGBT rights. In February 2012 a Libyan delegate sparked outrage after telling a United Nations human rights panel that gay people threaten the future of the human race.

Interim Constitution 

The Transitional Constitution stipulates that Islam is the official religion and a source of law.

The Transitional Constitution also pledges to respect the people's right to have a private life.

2019:
As of 2019, Libya has one LGBTQ+ NGO called Kun Libya. Libya's LGBT identifying population remains as of today under pressure to remain closeted due to the fall of the state since 2014.

Summary table

See also

Human rights in Libya
LGBT rights in Africa

References

Human rights in Libya
Libya
LGBT in Libya
Libya